Brandon Hagel (born August 27, 1998) is a Canadian professional ice hockey forward for the Tampa Bay Lightning of the National Hockey League (NHL). After making his NHL debut with the Chicago Blackhawks on March 11, 2020, the NHL season was postponed due to COVID-19.

During his four-season tenure with the Red Deer Rebels in the Western Hockey League (WHL), he set a new franchise record for most assists.

Early life
Hagel was born on August 27, 1998, in Saskatoon, Saskatchewan, but was raised in Morinville, Alberta.

Playing career
Hagel began his Bantam and Midget AAA ice hockey career with the Fort Saskatchewan Rangers in the Alberta Midget Hockey League (AMHL). In spite of recording 41 points in 33 games during the 2012–13 AMHL season, he was overlooked in the 2013 Western Hockey League (WHL) Bantam draft being too slight. Following this, he finished third in the AMJHL in scoring and was named to the Second All-Star Team. He finished his Bantam and Midget career playing with the Whitecourt Wolverines and recording one goal and two assists in two games.

Major junior
On September 17, 2015, Hagel was signed as a free agent by the Red Deer Rebels in the Western Hockey League (WHL). In his rookie season with the team, he helped lead them to the 2016 Memorial Cup against the London Knights and earned a final ranking of 104th overall by the NHL Central Scouting Bureau. He attributed much of his success to head coach and GM Brent Sutter, saying "[h]aving Brent as a coach, he pushes you every night. You have to get into the hard areas and the dirty areas for success to come....That’s what has sunk in is that for success to come, those things have to happen first. When those happen, success is going to come." Hagel was eventually selected 159th overall by the Buffalo Sabres in the 2016 NHL Entry Draft.

Prior to the 2017–18 season, Hagel participated in both the Rebels and Sabres' training camps. During a scrimmage with the Rebels, Hagel suffered a knee-on-knee injury and was expected to be returned to the WHL to complete the season. In spite of this, he was named an alternate captain and recorded three goals and two assists in back-to-back games against the Edmonton Oil Kings. Although he was healthy to begin the season, Hagel experienced an upper body injury and missed six weeks to recover.

By June 1, 2018, the Sabres were unable to sign Hagel to a contract and relinquished their rights to him, allowing him to become eligible for the 2018 NHL Entry Draft. He was subsequently invited to the Montreal Canadiens training camp on a tryout basis but began to 2018–19 season with the Rebels. After recording 30 points in 19 games, he signed a three-year, entry-level contract with the Chicago Blackhawks worth $925,000. He continued his success through his final season in the WHL, where he set a new franchise record for most assists and was selected for the WHL Eastern Conference Second All-Star Team. Hagel surpassed Arron Asham's 161 former franchise assist record on February 9, 2019, in a game against the Moose Jaw Warriors. On March 1, 2019, Hagel scored his 100th WHL point and 38th goal of the season in a 7–4 loss to the Medicine Hat Tigers.

Professional
After the Rebels were knocked out of the 2019 WHL playoffs, Hagel joined the Blackhawks American Hockey League affiliate, the Rockford IceHogs, for eight games and recorded one point. He attended the Blackhawks training camp prior to the 2018–19 season but was assigned to the Rockford IceHogs to begin the 2018–19 season. Hagel made his NHL debut on March 11, 2020, the day before the NHL season was postponed due to COVID-19.

As a black ace in the Blackhawks return to play first-round playoff exit, Hagel was unable to feature in a game. With the following 2020–21 season to be delayed, Hagel was loaned to second tier Swiss League club, HC Thurgau, on September 30, 2020.

As a restricted free agent with the Blackhawks following his breakout 2020–21 season, Hagel was re-signed to a three-year, $4.5 million contract extension on August 6, 2021.

In his third season with the Blackhawks in 2021–22, with the team well out of contention for the playoffs and having established new career marks with 21 goals and 37 points through 55 games, Hagel was traded by Chicago alongside two fourth-round draft picks to the Tampa Bay Lightning in exchange for two first-round picks in 2023 and 2024, Taylor Raddysh and Boris Katchouk on March 18, 2022.

Career statistics

Regular season and playoffs

International

References

External links
 

1998 births
Living people
Buffalo Sabres draft picks
Canadian ice hockey left wingers
Chicago Blackhawks players
HC Thurgau players
Ice hockey people from Alberta
Ice hockey people from Saskatchewan
Red Deer Rebels players
Rockford IceHogs (AHL) players
Sportspeople from Saskatoon
Tampa Bay Lightning players